Haidai may refer to:

Haidai (surname)
Haidai Region (海岱), region of Shandong, China east of Mount Tai
Kombu, or haidai 海带 in Chinese

See also